Calponin homology domain (or CH domain) is a family of actin binding domains found in both cytoskeletal proteins and signal transduction proteins. The domain is about 100 amino acids in length and is composed of four alpha helices. It comprises the following groups of actin-binding domains:

 Actinin-type (including spectrin, fimbrin, ABP-280)
 Calponin-type

A comprehensive review of proteins containing this type of actin-binding domains is given in.

The CH domain is involved in actin binding in some members of the family. However, in calponins there is evidence that the CH domain is not involved in its actin binding activity. Most proteins have two copies of the CH domain, however some proteins such as calponin and the human vav proto-oncogene have only a single copy. The structure of an example CH domain has been determined using X-ray crystallography.

Examples  
Human genes encoding calponin homology domain-containing proteins include: 
 ACTN1, ACTN2, ACTN3, ACTN4, ARHGEF6, ARHGEF7, ASPM,
 CLMN, CNN1, CNN2, CNN3,
 DIXDC1, DMD, DST,
 EHBP1, EHBP1L1,
 FLNA, FLNB, FLNC,
 GAS2, GAS2L1, GAS2L2, GAS2L3,
 IQGAP1, IQGAP2, IQGAP3,
 LCP1, LIMCH1, LMO7, LRCH1, LRCH2, LRCH3, LRCH4,
 MACF1, MAPRE1, MAPRE2, MAPRE3, MICAL1, MICAL2, MICAL2PV1, MICAL2PV2, MICAL3, MICALL1, MICALL2,
 NAV2, NAV3,
 PARVA, PARVB, PARVG, PLEC1, PLS1, PLS3, PP14183,
 SMTN, SMTNL2, SPECC1, SPECC1L, SPNB4, SPTB, SPTBN1, SPTBN2, SPTBN4, SPTBN5, SYNE1, SYNE2,
 TAGLN, TAGLN2, TAGLN3,
 UTRN, and
 VAV1, VAV2, VAV3

References

Protein domains